The Arab Cold War ( al-Harb al-`Arabiyyah al-bāridah) was a period of political rivalry in the Arab world from the early 1950s to the late 1970s as part of the broader Cold War. The generally accepted beginning of the Arab Cold War was the Egyptian revolution of 1952, which ultimately led to Gamal Abdel Nasser becoming President of Egypt in 1956. Thereafter, newly established Arab republics defined by revolutionary secular nationalism, and largely drawing inspiration from Nasser's Egypt, were engaged in political rivalries of varying degrees of ferocity with conservative traditionalist Arab monarchies, led chiefly by Saudi Arabia. The approximate end point of this period of internecine rivalry and conflict is generally viewed as being the 1979 Iranian Revolution, which culminated in the installation of Ayatollah Ruhollah Khomeini as the leader of Iran's theocratic government. Thereafter, the bitterness of intra-Arab strife was eclipsed by a new era of Arab-Iranian tensions.

Nasser espoused secular, pan-Arab nationalism, and socialism as a response to the Islamism, and rentierism of the Arab monarchies, as well as their perceived complicity in Western meddling in the Arab world. He also saw himself as the foremost champion of Palestinian liberation following the loss of 78% of the former Mandate of Palestine to the newly declared State of Israel in the Palestine War of 1948-1949. Following Egypt's political triumph in the Suez Crisis of 1956, known in the Arab World as the Tripartite Aggression, Nasser and the ideology associated with him rapidly gained support in other Arab countries from Iraq in the east to French-occupied Algeria in the west. Numerous Arab countries, notably Iraq, North Yemen, and Libya underwent the toppling of conservative regimes and their replacement with revolutionary republican governments, whilst Arab countries under Western occupation, chiefly Algeria, and South Yemen, saw the growth of nationalist insurrections aimed at national liberation. Contemporaneously, the already staunchly Arab nationalist Syria united with Egypt in the short-lived federal union of the United Arab Republic. A number of other attempts to unite the Arab states in various configurations were made, but all ultimately failed.

In turn, the monarchies, namely Saudi Arabia, Jordan, and Morocco (and, following their independence in the early 1970s,  the Gulf states) drew closer together as they sought to counter Egyptian influence through a variety of direct and indirect means. In particular, Saudi Arabia and Jordan, hitherto rivals due to the competing claims of their respective dynasties, cooperated closely in support of the royalist faction in the North Yemen Civil War that had become a proxy war between Egypt and Saudi Arabia following the establishment of the Nasserist Yemen Arab Republic in 1962.

The expression "Arab Cold War" was coined by American political scientist and Middle East scholar Malcolm H. Kerr in his 1965 book of that title, and subsequent editions. Despite the moniker, however, the Arab Cold War was not a clash between capitalist and communist economic systems. Indeed, with the exception of the Marxist government of South Yemen, all Arab governments expressly rejected communism, and criminalised the activities of communist activists within their territories. Moreover, the Arab states never sought membership of the competing military alliances of NATO, and the Warsaw Pact, with almost all Arab states being members of the Non-Aligned Movement. What tied the Arab Cold War to the wider global confrontation between the United States and the Soviet Union was that the United States backed the conservative Saudi Arabian-led monarchies, while the Soviet Union supported the Egyptian-led republics adhering to Arab socialism, notwithstanding their suppression of domestic Arab communist movements. In tandem with this was the Arab revolutionary nationalist republican support for anti-American, anti-Western, anti-imperialist, and anti-colonial revolutionary movements outside the Arab World, such as the Cuban Revolution, and the Arab monarchical support for conservative governments in predominantly Muslim countries, such as Pakistan.

By the late 1970s, the Arab Cold War is considered to have ended due to a number of factors. The unmitigated success of the State of Israel in the Six Day War of 1967 severely undermined the strategic strength of both Egypt and Nasser. Though the subsequent resolution to the North Yemen Civil War brokered by Nasser and King Faisal of Saudi Arabia was a victory for the Egyptian-backed Yemeni republicans, the intensity of the Egyptian-Saudi Arabian rivalry faded dramatically, as attention was focused on Egypt's efforts to liberate its own territory now under Israeli occupation. Nasser's death in 1970 was followed by the presidency of Anwar Sadat, who departed radically from Nasser's revolutionary platform, both domestically and in regional and international affairs. In particular, Sadat sought intimate strategic cooperation with Saudi Arabia under King Faisal, forging a relationship that was crucial to Egypt's successes in the first part of the October War of 1973. Capitalising on those initial successes, Sadat completed his departure from Nasserism by abandoning Egypt's strategic partnership with the Soviet Union in favour of the United States, and by making peace with the State of Israel in 1978 in exchange for the evacuation of all Israeli forces, and settlers from Egyptian territory. Sadat's peace treaty not only alienated Nasserists and other secular Arab nationalists, but enraged Islamists, who denounced him as an apostate. Egypt was suspended from the Arab League, entering virtual isolation in the region, whilst Islamism rose in popularity, culminating in the 1979 Iranian Revolution that established Shi'a Iran as a regional power vowing to topple the predominantly Sunni governments of Arab states, both republican and monarchical alike. As the outbreak of the Iran-Iraq War heralded the beginning of the 1980s, Egypt under Sadat, whilst still suspended from the Arab League, made common cause with Saudi Arabia in supporting Sunni-led Iraq against Shi'a Iran. Simultaneously, Sunni-Shi'a strife elsewhere in the region, notably Lebanon, took on the character of a new proxy conflict between Shia and Sunni Muslim regional powers.

Background 

Over the period, the history of the Arab states varies widely. In 1956, the year of the Suez Crisis, only Egypt, Syria, Lebanon, Tunisia, and Sudan, among the Arab states were republics; all, to some degree, subscribed to the Arab nationalist ideology, or at least paid lip-service to it. Jordan, and Iraq were both Hashemite monarchies; Morocco, Libya, Saudi Arabia, and North Yemen all had independent dynasties; and Algeria, South Yemen, Oman, and the Trucial States remained under either French colonial rule, or British occupation. By 1960, Iraq, Tunisia, Algeria, and North Yemen had republican governments or Arab nationalist insurgencies while Lebanon had a near-civil war between factions within the government which were US-aligned and Arab nationalist factions within the government which were Soviet- and Egyptian-aligned.

Because conflicts in the period varied over time and with different locations and perspectives, it is dated differently, depending on sources. Jordanian sources, for example, date the commencement of the Arab Cold War to April 1957, while Palestinian sources note the period of 1962 to 1967 as being most significant to them but within the larger Arab context.

History 

In the Egyptian Revolution of 1952, the Free Officers Movement toppled King Farouk. The Free Officers, led by Mohamed Naguib and Gamal Abdel Nasser, initiated a programme to radically change Egypt by dismantling feudalism, ending British influence in Egypt, and abolishing the monarchy and aristocracy. In 1953, they declared Egypt a republic. On 26 July 1956, Nasser nationalized the Suez Canal, following the withdrawal of an offer by the United Kingdom and the United States to fund the building of the Aswan Dam, which was in response to Egypt's new ties with the Soviet Union. The United Kingdom and France subsequently entered into a secret pact with Israel to jointly invade Egypt, but were forced to back off in what is known as the Suez Crisis. Nasser emerged from the war with great prestige, as the "unchallenged leader of Arab nationalism".

Nasser employed a number of political instruments in order to raise his profile across the Arab world – from radio programs such as the Voice of the Arabs to the organised dispatch of politically active Egyptian professionals, usually teachers.

In July 1958, the Hashemite Kingdom of Iraq was overthrown, with the king, crown prince and prime minister all killed by the nationalist revolutionaries. Iraq's monarchy was also replaced by a republic with an Arab nationalist orientation. Forces supporting Nasser and nationalism seemed ascendant, and older Arab monarchies seemed in peril. In 1969, yet another Arab kingdom fell, when the Free Officers Movement of Libya, a group of rebel military officers led by Colonel Muammar Gaddafi, overthrew the Kingdom of Libya led by King Idris.

In Saudi Arabia, Nasser's popularity was such that some Saudi princes (led by Prince Talal bin Abdul Aziz) rallied to his cause of Arab socialism. In 1962, a Saudi Air Force pilot defected to Cairo. There were signs of "unrest and subversion" in 1965 and 1966, "especially" in Saudi's oil-producing region. In 1969, a Nasserist plot was uncovered by the Saudi government "involving 28 army officer, 34 air force officers, nine other military personnel, and 27 civilians."

In the early 1960s, Nasser sent an expeditionary army to Yemen to support the anti-monarchist forces in the North Yemen Civil War. Yemen royalists were supported by Saudi Arabia and Jordan (both monarchies). Egyptian air power struck Saudi border towns like Najran in December 1962.

By the late 1960s, Nasser's prestige was diminished by the political failure of the political union of Egypt and Syria, and the military failures in Yemen where the civil war stalemated despite his commitment of thousands of troops to overthrow the monarchists, and especially with Israel where Egypt lost the Sinai Peninsula and 10,000 to 15,000 troops killed during the Six-Day War. In late 1967, Nasser and Saudi foreign minister Prince Faisal signed a treaty under which Nasser would pull out his 20,000 troops from Yemen, Faisal would stop sending arms to Yemen royalists, and three neutral Arab states would send in observers.

Islamic revival 

Though far smaller in population than Egypt, the Kingdom of Saudi Arabia had oil wealth and prestige as the land of Mecca and Medina, the two holiest cities of Islam. To use Islam as a counterweight to Nasser's Arab socialism, Saudi Arabia sponsored an international Islamic conference in Mecca in 1962. It created the Muslim World League, dedicated to spreading Islam and fostering Islamic solidarity. The League was "extremely effective" in promoting Islam, particularly conservative Wahhabi Islam, and also served to combat "radical alien ideologies" (such as Arab socialism) in the Muslim world.

Particularly after the Six-Day War, Islamic revival strengthened throughout the Arab world. After Nasser's death in 1970, his successor, Anwar Sadat, emphasized religion and economic liberalization rather than Arab nationalism and socialism. In Egypt's "shattering" 1967 defeat, "Land, Sea and Air" had been the military slogan; in the perceived victory of the October 1973 war, it was replaced with the Islamic battle cry of Allahu Akbar. While the October 1973 war was started by Egypt and Syria to take back the land conquered in 1967 by Israel, according to the French political scientist Gilles Kepel the "real victors" of the war were the Arab "oil-exporting countries", whose embargo against Israel's Western allies stopped Israel's counter-offensive. The embargo's political success enhanced the prestige of the embargo-ers and the reduction in the global supply of oil sent oil prices soaring (from US$3 per barrel to nearly $12) and with them, oil exporter revenues. This put Arab oil-exporting states in a "clear position of dominance within the Muslim world". The most dominant was Saudi Arabia, the largest exporter by far (see bar chart above).

In Egypt, the Muslim Brotherhood, which had been suppressed by the Egyptian government and aided by Saudi Arabia, was allowed to publish a monthly magazine, and its political prisoners were gradually released. At universities, Islamists took control and drove (anti-Sadat) student leftist and Pan-Arabist organizations underground. By the late 1970s, Sadat called himself 'The Believer President'. He banned most sales of alcohol and ordered Egypt's state-run television to interrupt programs with salat (Islamic call to prayer) on the screen five times a day and to increase religious programming.

Conflicts of the Arab Cold War

1950s 
 Egyptian revolution (1952)
 Iraqi Intifada (1952)
 Syrian coup d'état (1954)
 Jebel Akhdar War (1954–1959)
 Algerian revolution (1954–1962)
 Alleged Jordanian military coup attempt (1957)
 Syrian Crisis (1957)
 14 July Revolution (1958)
 Lebanon crisis (1958)
 Mosul uprising (1959)

1960s 
 Operation Vantage (1961)
 Bizerte crisis (1961)
 Syrian coup d'état (1961)
 North Yemen Civil War (1962–1970)
 Ramadan Revolution (1963)
 Syrian coup d'état (1963)
 Dhofar Rebellion (1963–1976)
 Sand War (1963)
 Aden Emergency (1963–1967)
 Syrian coup d'état (1966)
 Sudanese coup d'état (1969)
 Libyan coup d'état (1969)
 Al-Wadiah War (1969)

1970s 
 Black September (1970–1971)
 Corrective Movement (1970)
 Sudanese coup d'état (1971)
 Yemeni War (1972)
 Lebanese Civil War (1975–1990)
 Western Sahara War (1975–1991)
 Islamist uprising in Syria (1976–1982)
 Egyptian–Libyan War (1977)
 Chadian–Libyan War (1978–1987)
 NDF Rebellion (1978–1982)
 Yemeni War (1979)
 Khuzestan insurgency (1979)

1980s 
 Iran–Iraq War (1980–1988)
 Sudanese coup d'état (1985)
 South Yemen Civil War (1986)
 Damascus bombings (1986)

1990s 
 Yemeni unification (1990)
 Iraqi invasion of Kuwait (1990)
 Gulf War (1990–1991)
 Iraqi uprisings (1991)
 Algerian Civil War (1991–2002)
 Yemeni Civil War (1994)

See also 
 Arab Spring
 Arab Winter
 Cold War in Asia
 Gulf War
 Iran–Saudi Arabia proxy conflict
 Iran–Iraq War
 Iran–Israel proxy conflict
 Middle Eastern Cold War (disambiguation)
 Soviet–Afghan War
 The Cold War
 Qatar–Saudi Arabia diplomatic conflict

Notes

References

1950s conflicts
1960s conflicts
1970s conflicts
Arab history
Arab nationalism
Cold War conflicts
Egypt–Iraq relations
Egypt–Jordan relations
Egypt–Saudi Arabia relations
History of the Middle East
Iraq–Saudi Arabia relations
Iraq–Jordan relations
Jordan–Syria relations
Saudi Arabia–Syria relations